Deutsch Klasse is a German television series.

See also
List of German television series

2003 German television series debuts
German-language education television programming
Das Erste original programming